A variety of musical scales are used in traditional Japanese music. While a twelve-tone (dodecatonic) Chinese scale has influenced Japanese music since the Heian period, in practice Japanese traditional music is often based on pentatonic (five tone) or heptatonic (seven tone) scales. In some instances, harmonic minor is used, while the melodic minor is virtually unused.

Pentatonic scales
Japanese mode: a pentatonic musical scale with the intervals of the scale a major second, minor second, major third, minor second, and major third 
Akebono scale
Hirajōshi scale
In scale
Insen scale
Iwato scale
Ritsu and ryo scales
Yo scale

Further reading
Koizumi Fumio. Musical Scales in Japanese Music. Heibonsha, Tokyo, 1977
Sir Francis Taylor Piggott, Thomas Lea Southgate. The Music and Musical Instruments of Japan. B.T. Batsford, 1893
William P. Malm. Traditional Japanese Music and Musical Instruments. Kodansha International, 2000. , 9784770023957
 Cargill Gilston Knott. Remarks on Japanese musical scales. Asiatic Society of Japan, 1891

References

Musical scales
Japanese music